, or  is a deity that appears in folklore and legends of various parts of Japan, including, for example, Hakone (Kanagawa), Nagano Prefecture and Fukui Prefecture. In many cases, the Kuzuryū is associated with water.

Hakone Kuzuryū legend

During the Nara period, a legend arose that the Nine-headed Dragon had settled in Lake Ashi in Hakone, and that it demanded a sacrifice. To appease the dragon, the villagers agreed to select a house by shooting a white-feathered arrow and seeing where it landed, then sacrificing the daughter of the house. A priest named Mankan cursed the dragon, and is said to have chained it to the Upside-down Cedar (an underwater rock formation). The expression "send up a white-feathered arrow" has come to mean "choose by lot."

The legend continues, saying Mankan saw the dragon reform and change into a Dragon King. He then built a shrine to the dragon. After this the customary offering to the dragon changed from human sacrifice to steamed rice with red beans.

Other Kuzuryū legends

Kuzuryū in Togakushi, Fukui prefecture
Kuzuryū is said to have appeared in response to the echoing sound of a rock door to a cave torn off by another god, and flung down to earth. The thrown door became Mount Togakushi, and Kuzuryū became a nearby mountain of the same name. At the foot of Mount Togakushi resides Togakushi Shrine, where a small shrine dedicated to the Kuzuryū can be found.

Indian influence
Kuzuryū's origins can be tracted to the Hindu deities Vāsuki and Śeṣa, Nāgarajas who guard Mount Meru. According to Hindu myth, Śeṣa was one of one thousand nāga offspring of Kaśyapa and Kadrū. His appearance is that of a giant snake with one thousand heads. The earrings, crown, and corolla attached to each one of one thousand heads depict are decorated with swastikas.

When Buddhism was introduced to China, Vāsuki was recognized as one of the Eight Great Nāga Kings. In Japan, due to the influence of Shintō on Buddhism, Vāsuki became a guardian deity in both religions. The Eight Nāga Kings became influential in the esoteric tradition, which has a strong focus on obtaining worldly benefits. This was reflected in Kuzuryū's role as a rainmaker deity. 
Kuzuryū is sometimes referred to as Kuzuryū Gongen, which refers to his identification with Vāsuki.

See also

 Lake Ashi
 Lernaean Hydra
 Nagaraja
 Shesha
 Vasuki
Yamata no Orochi

References

External links
  Hakone jinja, aka Kuzuryu jinja 

Japanese dragons
Mythical many-headed creatures